Raju Aryal is the Inspector General of Armed Police Force (Nepal). On May 2, 2022, he was named as the Armed Police Force (Nepal) 12th's chief.

References

External links
 Armed Police Force, Nepal

Living people
Year of birth missing (living people)